This is the list of Educational Institutions of Nair Service Society

Colleges

Arts and science colleges

Training colleges

Other colleges

Schools

High schools - Day Schools

High Schools -  Boarding

Higher Secondary Schools - Day Schools

Higher Secondary Schools - Boarding Schools

Vocational higher secondary schools

Kerala education-related lists
Educational institutions